Stoddard Hill State Park is a public recreation area located on the eastern shore of the Thames River, about  south of Norwich, in the town of Ledyard, Connecticut. The state park covers 55 acres and offers facilities for boating, fishing, and hiking. It is managed by the Connecticut Department of Energy and Environmental Protection.

History
The park was donated to the state in 1954. It is one of several Connecticut state parks that were acquired with funds bequeathed by George Dudley Seymour for the purpose of purchasing recreational areas for public use.

Activities and amenities
The park includes a five-acre tidal estuary with ramp for car-top boating. A trail leads to the top of a  hill that was used by Native Americans as a lookout.

References

External links
Stoddard Hill State Park Connecticut Department of Energy and Environmental Protection
Stoddard Hill State Park Map Connecticut Department of Energy and Environmental Protection

State parks of Connecticut
Parks in New London County, Connecticut
Protected areas established in 1954
1954 establishments in Connecticut
Ledyard, Connecticut